Rukūʿ can refer to either of two things in Islam: 
 The act of belt-low bowing in  standardized prayers, where the backbone should be in rest, before straightening up to go for sujud (full earth-low bowing). 
 A paragraph of the Quran.

In prayer, it refers to the bowing at the waist from standing (qiyām) on the completion of recitation (qiraʾat) of a portion of the Qur'an in Islamic formal prayers (salah). There is a consensus on the obligatory nature of the rukūʿ. The position of rukūʿ is established by bending over till the hands are on the knees and remaining in that position until one attains a relaxed state while glorifying God ( subḥāna rabbiya l-ʿaẓīm, "Glory be to my Lord, the Most Magnificent!") thrice or more in odd number of times.

In Al-Ghazali's book Inner Dimensions of Islamic Worship, he wrote about the rukūʿ by saying:

Bowing (rukūʿ) and prostration (sujūd) are accompanied by a renewed affirmation of the supreme greatness of Allah. In bowing you renew your submissiveness and humility, striving to refine your inner feeling through a fresh awareness of your own importance and insignificance before the might and grandeur of your Lord. To confirm this, you seek the aid of your tongue, glorifying your Lord and testifying repeatedly to His supreme majesty, both inwardly and outwardly.

Qur'anic subdivision
The term rukūʿ — roughly translated to "passage", "pericope" or "stanza" — is also used to denote a group of thematically related verses in the Quran. Longer chapters (surah) in the Qur'an are usually divided into several rukūʿs, so that the reciters could identify when to make ruku in Salah without breaking an ongoing topic in the Quranic text. There are 558 rukūʿs in the Qur'an.

See also
Raka'ah
Poyasny, bowing in the Eastern Orthodox Church, which originate from Jewish bowing
Saikeirei

References

Salah
Arabic words and phrases
Gestures of respect
Bowing
Salah terminology